Uzi Hitman (June 9, 1952 – October 17, 2004) was an Israeli singer-songwriter, composer, musician, actor, director and television personality.

Biography
Uzi Hitman was born in Giv'at Shmuel and lived all his life in Ramat Gan. His parents, Holocaust survivors, followed a traditionalist Jewish lifestyle; his father served as a cantor. He and his sibling Chaim, who lives in Ra'anana attended secular schools. At home they listened to the Beatles, the Rolling Stones, Enrico Macias and opera along with liturgical and religious songs. When Hitman was 11, his parents gave him his first guitar, which he taught himself to play. When he turned 17, he received a piano from his grandmother. From 1971 to 1973, he served in the Israeli Central Command military entertainment troupe, along with Shem Tov Levy, Shlomo Bar-Aba, Dorit Reuveni and others.

Music career
His career began in 1976, when he composed a popular melody for Adon Olam. He became a popular Israeli artist during the 1980s and 1990s. He composed and wrote over 650 songs. His most famous songs include "Noladati Lashalom" ('I Was Born for Peace'), "Ratziti Sheteda" ('I Wanted You to Know'), "Todah" ('Thank You'), "Mi yada' sh'kach yihiye" ('Who Knew It Would Be Like This') and "Kan" ('Here'), which reached third place during the 1991 Eurovision Song Contest. Hitman also appeared on the 1980s children's programmes Parpar Nechmad, Hopa Hei and Shirim K'tanim.

Hitman was a devoted supporter of Maccabi Haifa, and even wrote it’s 1993-94 championship song named “Green in the eyes”, (ירוק בעיניים) which he gave to Haim Moshe. He also wrote and performed it’s 2001 championship song “Here she rises”, (הנה היא עולה).

Death and commemoration
Hitman died following a heart attack at  age 52. Following a funeral in Ramat Gan, he was buried at the Yarkon Cemetery near Tel Aviv. The City of Ramat Gan renamed Kikar Hashoshanim ('Roses Square') in his neighborhood of residence to Kikar Hitman (Hitman Square).

A minute of silence was given to Hitman during a Maccabi Haifa match against Bnei Yehuda, followed up by fans singing the chorus of the championship song he wrote for the club.

See also
Music of Israel

References

External links

 Official site 

1952 births
2004 deaths
Jewish Israeli musicians
Israeli male composers
Israeli people of Polish-Jewish descent
Israeli male singer-songwriters
Israeli television personalities
Israeli male television actors
Children's musicians
20th-century Israeli male singers
Burials at Yarkon Cemetery